Ridgetown (Carnie Airfield) Aerodrome  is a registered aerodrome located  southeast of Ridgetown, Ontario, Canada.

References

Registered aerodromes in Ontario
Transport in Chatham-Kent
Buildings and structures in Chatham-Kent